Jindřich Abdul (born 1 February 1996) is a Czech professional ice hockey player who currently plays professionally for HC Litvínov of the Czech Extraliga (ELH).

He previously played for HK Poprad and HC Slovan Bratislava of the Slovak Extraliga.

Career statistics
Bold indicates led league

References

External links

1996 births
Living people
People from Vsetín
Czech ice hockey right wingers
Orli Znojmo players
VHK Vsetín players
HK Poprad players
HC Slovan Bratislava players
Severstal Cherepovets players
Motor České Budějovice players
Sportspeople from the Zlín Region
Czech expatriate ice hockey players in Slovakia